This article is about the particular significance of the year 1868 to Wales and its people.

Incumbents

Lord Lieutenant of Anglesey – Henry Paget, 2nd Marquess of Anglesey 
Lord Lieutenant of Brecknockshire – Charles Morgan, 1st Baron Tredegar
Lord Lieutenant of Caernarvonshire – Edward Douglas-Pennant, 1st Baron Penrhyn (from 14 September) 
Lord Lieutenant of Cardiganshire – Edward Pryse
Lord Lieutenant of Carmarthenshire – John Campbell, 2nd Earl Cawdor 
Lord Lieutenant of Denbighshire – Robert Myddelton Biddulph    
Lord Lieutenant of Flintshire – Sir Stephen Glynne, 9th Baronet 
Lord Lieutenant of Glamorgan – Christopher Rice Mansel Talbot 
Lord Lieutenant of Merionethshire – Edward Lloyd-Mostyn, 2nd Baron Mostyn
Lord Lieutenant of Monmouthshire – Henry Somerset, 8th Duke of Beaufort
Lord Lieutenant of Montgomeryshire – Sudeley Hanbury-Tracy, 3rd Baron Sudeley
Lord Lieutenant of Pembrokeshire – William Edwardes, 3rd Baron Kensington
Lord Lieutenant of Radnorshire – John Walsh, 1st Baron Ormathwaite

Bishop of Bangor – James Colquhoun Campbell
Bishop of Llandaff – Alfred Ollivant 
Bishop of St Asaph – Thomas Vowler Short 
Bishop of St Davids – Connop Thirlwall

Events
13 January – The brig Albion runs aground off Whitford Point and is abandoned by her seven crew members, all of whom drown. 
22 January – Sixteen vessels are lost in a gale off the Burry estuary, with a total of thirty lives lost.
1 February – At the bridge over the Severn at Caersws an approach embankment, damaged by flood water, collapses under a train. The driver and fireman are killed.
July – Pastor Karl Herman Lunde begins fund-raising for the new Norwegian Seamen's Church in Cardiff.
4 August – Opening of the Bala and Dolgelly Railway, completing the Ruabon to Barmouth Line via Corwen and alongside Bala Lake.
20 August – Abergele rail disaster: 33 people die in a fire resulting from a collision between a mail train and a set of trucks at Llandulas station near Abergele, the greatest loss of life in a railway accident in Wales.
October – Work begins on Nant-y-Ffrith reservoir.
2 December – The United Kingdom general election leaves Gladstone's Liberals the dominant party in Wales, with 21 seats.
 Among the Conservative members who lose their seats are Crawshay Bailey and Henry Austin Bruce, the latter replaced by two MPs for the expanded constituency of Merthyr Tydfil: Richard Fothergill and Henry Richard.
 Richard Davies becomes MP for Anglesey.
 Love Jones-Parry wins Caernarvonshire from Douglas Pennant.
 George Osborne Morgan is elected for the first time in Denbighshire, winning the seat from the lord lieutenant, Robert Myddelton Biddulph.
 Farmers in Cardiganshire are evicted for returning a Liberal MP, Thomas Lloyd.
 John Crichton-Stuart, 3rd Marquess of Bute, sponsors restoration work at Caerphilly Castle.
 English manufacturer Frederick Walton, the inventor of linoleum, takes up residence on his father's Cwmllecoediog Estate near Aberangell, whose development he begins.
 First publication of the Welsh-language periodical, Baner America, in the USA.
 Y Dydd is founded, with Samuel Roberts (S. R.) as editor.
 Iron Age crannog is discovered on an island in Llangorse Lake, near Brecon.

Arts and literature

Awards
 National Eisteddfod of Wales is held at Ruthin.

New books

English language
 William Forbes Skene – The Four Ancient Books of Wales

Welsh language
 Robert Elis (Cynddelw) – Geiriadur Cymreig Cymraeg
 John Ceiriog Hughes – Oriau eraill
 Jabez Edmund Jenkins – Rhiangerdd – Gwenfron o'r Dyffryn
 Griffith Jones (Glan Menai) – Enwogion Sir Aberteifi
 Rhys Gwesyn Jones – Caru, Priodi, a Byw
 John Phillips (Tegidon) – Y Ddeilen ar y Traeth

Music
 William Lewis Barrett is appointed flautist at the Italian Opera of Lutz.
 Gŵyl Ardudwy music festival is founded by John Roberts (Ieuan Gwyllt).
 Publication of Llyfr Tonau ac Emynau, edited by Edward Stephen (Tanymarian) and Joseph David Jones.

Sport
 Cricket
 May – A team from Cadoxton play the United South of England (including W. G. Grace) at The Gnoll, Neath.

Births
13 April  (in Birkenhead) – Caradoc Rees, politician (d. 1924)
29 May – Sydney Nicholls, Wales rugby international player (d. 1946)
10 June
John Jones (Ioan Brothen), poet (d. 1940)
David Prosser, bishop (d. 1950)
2 August – Sir Alfred Edward Lewis, banker (d. 1940)
28 August – Thomas Charles Williams, minister (d. 1927)
28 November – Arthur Linton, cyclist (d. 1896)
30 November – Ernest Newman, English-born music critic of Welsh parentage (d. 1959)
29 December – William Owen Jones (Eos y Gogledd), musician (d. 1928)
date unknown
Roger Doughty, English-born footballer of Welsh maternity (d. 1914)
David Matthews, politician (d. 1960)

Deaths
13 January – John Parry, Mormon convert, 79
25 April – Sarah Williams, English novelist of Welsh parentage, 30
22 June – Owain Meirion, poet, 65
3 August – Edward Welch, architect, 61/62
17 August – William Nevill, 4th Earl of Abergavenny, 76
11 September – Maria James, poet, 74
16 September – John Vaughan, English ironmaster, 68
24 November – Sir John Dorney Harding, lawyer, 59
date unknown – Dafydd Jones (Dewi Dywyll), balladeer (born 1803)

References

 
Wales